Zagarzazú International Airport  is an airport serving the city of Carmelo in Colonia Department, Uruguay. South approach and departure may be over the river.

History
On December 19, 2022 a new passenger terminal was dedicated.

Airlines and destinations

No scheduled flights operate at this airport.

See also

Transport in Uruguay
List of airports in Uruguay

References

External links
 OpenStreetMap - Balneario Zagarzazú
 OurAirports - Carmelo Airport
 FallingRain - Carmelo International Airport

Airports in Uruguay
Buildings and structures in Colonia Department